His English Wife (German: Die Lady ohne Schleier, Swedish: Hans engelska fru) is a 1927 German-Swedish silent drama film directed by Gustaf Molander and starring Lil Dagover, Gösta Ekman and Karin Swanström. It was shot at the Råsunda Studios in Stockholm. The film's sets were designed by the art director Vilhelm Bryde.

Cast

References

Bibliography
 Daniel Donoghue. Lady Godiva: A Literary History of the Legend. John Wiley & Sons, 2008.

External links
 

1927 films
1927 drama films
Swedish silent feature films
Swedish drama films
German silent feature films
German drama films
Films of the Weimar Republic
Films directed by Gustaf Molander
German black-and-white films
Swedish black-and-white films
Films set in Stockholm
Silent drama films
1920s Swedish films
1920s German films